Kushat may refer to:
 Kushat-e Avval
 Kushat-e Dum
 Kushat-e Sum